ESP produces several bass guitar models based on the custom models of Tom Araya, the bassist for thrash metal band Slayer.

Current ESP models:
ESP Tom Araya
ESP LTD TA-600
ESP LTD TA-200

See also
Slayer

ESP electric bass guitars